is a Japanese ski mountaineer.

Sato was born in Gunma. He started ski mountaineering in 2000 and participated in his first race in 2004. He lives in Tokyo.

Selected results 
 2007:
 2nd, Asian Championship, individual
 2009:
 1st, Asian Championship, individual
 1st, Asian Championship, relay (mixed team), together with Mase Chigaya, Suzuki Keiichiro and Hiraide Kazuya
 3rd, Asian Championship, vertical race

References

External links 
 Yoshiyuki Sato at SkiMountaineering.org

1975 births
Living people
Japanese male ski mountaineers
Sportspeople from Gunma Prefecture
21st-century Japanese people